DWSS (104.7 FM), broadcasting as 104.7 Bossing FM, is a radio station owned and operated by Caceres Broadcasting Corporation. Its studio and transmitter are located at the 3rd Floor, One Magsaysay Corporate Center, Magsaysay Ave., Naga, Camarines Sur.

It was formerly known as Power 104 from 1995 to 2011, when it went off the air. In early 2016, DCG Radio-TV Network took over the station's operations and transferred its studios to J.A. Abucar Bldg. along Maharlika Highway. On September 16 that year, it was launched as DCG FM with a classic hits format. It went off the air sometime in 2017 due to transmitter problems.

References

Radio stations in Naga, Camarines Sur